Koilonychia, also known as spoon nails, is a nail disease that can be a sign of hypochromic anemia, especially  iron-deficiency anemia. It refers to abnormally thin nails (usually of the hand) which have lost their convexity, becoming flat or even concave in shape.  In a sense, koilonychia is the opposite of nail clubbing. In early stages nails may be brittle and chip or break
easily.

Koilonychia is associated with Plummer–Vinson syndrome and iron deficiency anemia. It has also been associated with lichen planus, syphilis, and rheumatic fever. The term is from the Greek: κοῖλος, koilos, "hollow", ὄνυξ, onyx, "nail".

Even though Koilonychia has been associated with iron deficiency in case reports, it is more likely seen as an occupational change in nails and may be idiopathic; ruling out iron deficiency anemia in these patients is the only work-up necessary in this condition.

See also 
 Kyrle disease
 List of cutaneous conditions

References

External links 

 

Conditions of the skin appendages